Charles Olke van der Plas (15 May 1891, Buitenzorg – 7 June 1977, Zwolle) was an administrator in the Dutch East Indies colonial government who served as the Governor of the state of East Java from 1936 to 1941. He joined the Dutch civil service in 1908 and served as the Dutch consul to Jeddah in Saudi Arabia. Van der Plas was influenced by the Dutch Islamicist scholar Christiaan Snouck Hurgronje and became an expert in Indonesian society and politics, Islam and Arabic.

Following the Japanese occupation of Indonesia during World War Two, he served as a member of the Netherlands Indies Civil Administration. Van der Plas played an important role in establishing the State of Madura, a constituent state of the federal planned Republic of the United States of Indonesia.

Bibliography

References

 Archives and biography 
 Biography at the Biographical portal to the Netherlands website

1891 births
1977 deaths
Dutch colonial governors and administrators
20th-century Dutch diplomats
Leiden University alumni
People from Bogor
People of the Dutch East Indies
20th-century Dutch civil servants
Dutch expatriates in Saudi Arabia